The United Cigar Manufacturing Company building is an historic building located at York, York County, Pennsylvania.

History
The building was constructed as a cigar factory in 1907 by the United Cigar Manufacturing Company of New York City.

United Cigar was formed in 1902 by the consolidation of Kerbs, Wertheim & Schiffer; Hirschhorn, Mack & Company; and Stratton & Storm Company. It was subsequently incorporated in New York under the same name in 1906. As of 1907, the company owned and operated 19 factories in New York, Pennsylvania and New Jersey and manufactured 400 million cigars annually for the wholesale market. It became the General Cigar Company about 1917.

The cigar factory was operated for an undetermined period as the York City Cigar Company. After 1932, the building housed printers and clothing manufacturers and is currently used as an apartment building.

The building was added to the National Register of Historic Places in 1999.

Construction
The three-story, brick building is on a stone foundation and has a low-pitched gable roof.  The main facade is 18 bays wide and has a 4-bay-wide, 1-bay-deep, center pavilion.  The building measures 174 feet wide by 41 feet deep.

See also
National Register of Historic Places listings in York County, Pennsylvania

References

Buildings and structures in York, Pennsylvania
Industrial buildings and structures on the National Register of Historic Places in Pennsylvania
Industrial buildings completed in 1907
Historic cigar factories
Tobacco buildings in the United States
National Register of Historic Places in York County, Pennsylvania